Our Blooming Youth is an ongoing South Korean television series directed by Lee Jong-jae, and starring Park Hyung-sik, Jeon So-nee, Pyo Ye-jin, Yoon Jong-seok, and Lee Tae-sun. It premiered on February 6, 2023 on tvN, and airs every Monday and Tuesday at 20:50 (KST). It is also available for streaming on Amazon Prime Video and Viki in selected regions.

Synopsis 
A crown prince who is under a mysterious curse and a genius girl who has been framed  as the murderer  of her family.

Cast

Main 
 Park Hyung-sik as Lee Hwan
 A lonely crown prince who holds the secret of a mysterious curse.
 Jeon So-nee as Min Jae-yi
 A genius girl who pursues the truth while being framed for the murder of her immediate family.
 Pyo Ye-jin as Ga-ram  
 Min Jae-yi's only friend.
 Yoon Jong-seok as Han Seong-on
 Lee Hwan's friend and Min Jae-yi's fiancée.
 Lee Tae-sun as Kim Myung-jin
 The best person in Joseon who studied everything in the world.

Supporting

People around Han Seong-on 
 Jo Sung-ha as Left State Councillor Han Jung-eon  
 Left State Councillor and the head of the prestigious Yeongsan Han family.

People around Kim Myung-jin 
 Son Byung-ho as Chief State Councillor Kim An-jik
 Chief State Councillor who protects the neutrality of the court and stands firmly on the side of the Crown Prince in the palace.
 Kim Ki-doo as Man-dok
Bok-soo's husband who is the owner of a tavern together with his wife is known for their generosity.
 Lee Min-ji as Bok-soon
Man-dok's wife.
 Park Hyo-jun as Sam-chil
The owner of a building that renting Manyeondang to Myung-jin.
 Jung In-gyeom as Monk Mujin
Kim Myung-jin's teacher who has gray-haired long hair looks like a god, not a monk. Some people call him a taoist.

People in the Palace 
 Heo Won-seo as Tae-gang
 A silent escort who always follows Lee Hwan like a shadow.
 Choi Dae-chul as Eunuch So
Crown Prince's eunuch with the title of the senior 5th rank.
 Park Won-ho as Eunuch Cha
Crown Prince's eunuch.
 Oh Hee-joon as Eunuch Kim
Crown Prince's eunuch.

Royal Palace 
 Lee Jong-hyuk as King
 Lee Hwan's father who ruled Joseon.
 Hong Soo-hyun as Queen / Cho Soo-young (personal name)  
 The Queen and niece of Right State Councillor Cho Won-bo.
 Jung Woong-in as Right State Councillor Cho Won-bo
 Right State Councillor and head of the Queen's family.
 Jung Da-eun as Princess Ha-yeon  
 The king's beloved daughter and Lee Hwan's younger sister.
 Im Han-bin as Grand Prince Myeongan
 Lee Hwan's younger half-brother who was born as a child to Gye-bi and the King.

Others 
 Lee Ha-yool as Crown Prince Uihyeon
 The deceased crown prince who died three years ago.
 Seo Tae-hwa as Min Ho-seung  
 Min Jae-yi's deceased father.
 Jo Jae-ryong as Cho Won-oh  
 Cho Won-bo's cousin who is a criminal judge.
 Kim Tae-hyang as Yoon Seung-beom
 A loyal butler of Han family.
 Yoon Ye-hee as Special Court Lady Kwon Deok-sim
 Son Kwang-eup as court official
 Park Seon-woo as Cho Eung-yoon
 Yoon Da-in as the Queen's butler

Special appearance 
 Kim Woo-seok as Sim-yeong
 Jang Yeo-bin as the daughter of Lee Pan's family
 Lee Chae-kyung as shaman
 Yoon Seok-hyun as Song-ga
 Cha Seo-won as Jang-eui

Original soundtrack

Part 1

Part 2

Viewership

References

External links 
  
 
 
  at Prime Video
  at Viki

Korean-language television shows
TVN (South Korean TV channel) television dramas
Television series by Story & Pictures Media
Television series by Studio Dragon
Television series set in the Joseon dynasty
South Korean historical television series
South Korean romance television series
South Korean mystery television series
2023 South Korean television series debuts